Ian Thornton Craig (born 26 January 1931) is a former English cricketer. Craig was a right-handed batsman who bowled right-arm medium-fast. He was born at Maidstone, Kent.

Craig made his debut in county cricket for Cambridgeshire in the 1955 Minor Counties Championship against Lincolnshire. From 1955 to 1959, Craig made 21 appearances for Cambridgeshire in the Minor Counties Championship, with his final appearance coming against Bedfordshire. In 1959, he made his only appearance in first-class cricket for a combined Minor Counties team against the touring Indians at Longton Cricket Club Ground, Stoke-on-Trent. Batting first, the Indians scored 287 all out in their first-innings, during which Craig took the wickets of Arvind Apte and Pankaj Roy, finishing the innings with figures of 2/46. The Minor Counties responded with 228 all out in their first-innings, during which Craig, who batted at number nine, was dismissed for a single run by A. G. Kripal Singh. The Indians then made 274/7 declared in their second-innings, during which he bowled 15 wicketless overs. The Minor Counties then successfully chased down their target, reaching 334/4 to win by six wickets and hand the team a famous victory.

References

External links
Ian Craig at ESPNcricinfo
Ian Craig at CricketArchive

1931 births
Living people
Sportspeople from Maidstone
English cricketers
Cambridgeshire cricketers
Minor Counties cricketers